Bryan Dattilo (born July 29, 1971) is an American actor. He is best known for his role as Lucas Horton on the NBC daytime soap opera Days of Our Lives.

Personal life
Dattilo was born in Kankakee, Illinois, subsequently moving to West Palm Beach, Florida after his parents' divorce, where his mother became one of the first female editors for The National Enquirer.  He later moved to Los Angeles and at the age of 9, he began taking acting lessons with his sister, Kristin. A short time later, he landed his first acting job in a re-curring role on HBO's Not Necessarily The News.

Dattilo has one brother, Brent, one sister, Kristin, and three half-sisters, Tiffany, Anna, and Tess. His family is of Italian descent.

In 1989, Dattilo graduated from Beverly Hills High School. He attended Santa Monica College in Santa Monica and majored in Psychology.

Bryan has one son, Gabriel (Gabe) and a grandson, Alexander Gabriel Dattilo from his first marriage to Jessica Denay.

On July 12, 2011, Dattilo married Elizabeth Cameron in Palos Verdes, California. He and Liz have one daughter, Delila, who can be seen in numerous TV commercials.

Career
Along with his regular appearances on Days of Our Lives, he has had numerous guest starring roles including Saved by the Bell, CSI: NY, California Dreams, Doogie Howser, M.D., In the Heat of the Night, and Charles In Charge. Dattilo was pegged for the role of Tommy Oliver for the television series Mighty Morphin Power Rangers but declined the role when he was cast in Days of Our Lives.

Bryan's latest passion is his new podcast, Conspiracies Inc., officially launched in March 2022. With an encyclopedia knowledge of the paranormal, Dattilo interviews top experts in the UFO/Alien universe and delves into his own alleged abduction by grey aliens in 1993.

References

External links

 Conspiracies Inc. Podcast Official Website

1971 births
American male film actors
American male soap opera actors
Living people
Male actors from Los Angeles
People from Kankakee, Illinois
People from Palm Beach, Florida
Santa Monica College alumni